Albert IV may refer to:

Albert IV, Count of Tyrol (c. 1180–1253)
Albert IV, Count of Habsburg (c. 1188–1239)
Albert IV, Duke of Saxe-Lauenburg (1315 – 1343)
Albert IV, Duke of Mecklenburg (before 1363–1388)
Albert IV, Duke of Austria (1377–1404)
Albert IV, Prince of Anhalt-Köthen (died 1423)
Albert IV, Margrave of Meissen (1443–1500)
Albert IV, Duke of Bavaria (1447–1508)
Albert IV, Duke of Saxe-Eisenach (1599–1644)

de:Liste der Herrscher namens Albrecht#Albrecht IV.